This is a list of notable stand-up comedians from Australia.

See also

 List of Australian comedians
 List of stand-up comedians

 
Stand-up comedians
Australian stand-up